Shinedown iTunes Session is part of the iTunes Originals series of releases. Unlike the others in this series there are no interviews, and it is an EP. All tracks are originally from Shinedown's third studio album, The Sound of Madness.

Track listing
All tracks written by Brent Smith and Dave Bassett

Personnel
 Brent Smith - lead vocals
 Zach Myers - guitar, backing vocals
 Eric Bass - bass guitar, piano, backup vocals
 Barry Kerch - drums

Charts

References

2010 EPs
ITunes Session
Shinedown albums
2010 live albums
Live EPs